Child prostitution in Ukraine has been described by Juan Miguel Petit, Special Rapporteur on the Sale of Children, Child Prostitution and Child Pornography for the United Nations, as a major problem in the country. A research publication "2016 Findings on the Worst Forms of Child Labor" prepared by Bureau of International Labor Affairs reports that the Ukrainian children engage in the worst forms of child labor including production of pornography and sex work. Orphaned, homeless, and street children are trafficked both domestically and transnationally.
In the past the majority of prostitutes were girls from urban districts. Now most victims of child prostitution in Ukraine come from small towns and rural regions, and prostitution of Ukrainian boys has increased.

The Ukrainian legal system does not provide a clear definition for "prostitution" and "child prostitution". It levies a harsh punishment for the involvement of children into commercial sex work, but their clients are often not prosecuted. As a result, the children become liable for their own exploitation.

Social and economic background
Ukrainian independence in 1991 brought to the nation all kinds of freedom and high aspirations of a bright economic future . In 2005 Ukraine plunged into a first economic crisis which quickly spread across the country hitting the most vulnerable groups of society hard. After the first wave of economic issues, the local data demonstrated a short recovery in 2006, but this was just a preface of system crises of 2008. Economy of the Ukraine faced the crises being under pressure of financial debts, high inflation, unstable national currency and ubiquitous corruption. The bad economic situation of 2008 was aggravated by accumulated social problems, like poor education, inappropriate healthcare and unfavorable demography. The absence of systematic and consistent reforms in Ukraine led to a wasting of huge budget spent for social programs. As a result, the Ukrainian society experiences a high level of poverty, inequality of opportunities and uneven access of people to different public services. Subsequently, a number of divorces is growing and single parent family is becoming more and more common in Ukraine, also the situation has a negative impact on children and enhances a problem of child poverty. In poor families children experience a higher risk of being involved in criminal activity, prostitution and vagrancy.

General overview
According to Ukrainian media the country along with Moldova and Portugal became a European center of child sex tourism. With respect to the situation Mark Capaldi, ECPAT's head of policy and research, expressed a concern that the countries "see tourism as a fantastic economic development sector" ignoring the risks which international tourists impend to the children.

The sexual exploitation of children is most obvious in Kyiv and some other big cities. Many children are forced to migrate there to get education and then they are getting involved into Ukrainian sex industry to support themselves. An involvement of Ukrainian adolescent boys into prostitution has risen a number of special concerns.

There is a consistent trend of human trafficking from the Ukraine, especially women and children. International Organization for Migration reports that the Ukraine became one of the major sources of minors and females for their forced sexual exploitation; as a rule they are sold to Balkans, Central Europe and Middle East. An average price of Ukrainian girl is around $2,000 — $10,000 depending on her destination. In Israel a Ukrainian youngster may earn up to $50,000 — $100,000 annually for her pimp and have nothing left for herself. According to the available statistics the number of Ukrainian children involved in prostitution is growing both domestically and abroad.
UN Special Rapporteur on the Sale of Children, Child Prostitution and Child Pornography Juan Miguel Petit concluded that the human trafficking and commercial exploitation of children are major problems in the country. After his visit to Ukraine he filed a special report to the UN Human Rights Committee, which says that 10% of the victims of human trafficking are aged between 13 and 18. Children of Ukraine are being exploited in different businesses for example as servants, in street trading, and to provide sex services. A typical model of the human trafficking in Ukraine is that the children are becoming victims of sexual exploitation residing within their country. In the majority of the incidents the Ukrainian criminals lure the potential victims into debt and then force them become prostitutes.

Available data and statistics
An estimation of a total number of female sex workers in Ukraine is around 70,000, 15,000 of them are at the 14–19. A study performed by the Ukrainian Institute for Social Research demonstrated that 11% of Ukrainian women who provide sexual services are aged between 12 and 15 years old, 20% of Ukrainian prostitutes are from 16 to 17 years old. In some registered cases the age of Ukrainian girls involved in prostitution was as low as 10 years old.

There is no data about the age when Ukrainian children enter the sex industry, but there are some statistical data indicating that the average age of "sexual debut" in Ukraine is declining. In general it has dropped to 15-16 years, but for many situations it might be as low as 9-10 years. As to Ukrainian boys, it was reported that 3% of them had their first sexual experience at the age 11 or even earlier. Also a survey of Ukrainian children in the age group of 11-years old has shown that 21% of boys and 5% of girls admitted that they already had their first sexual contact. This situation apparently results from infiltration of Western mass culture of consumerism and degradation of traditional values among young Ukrainians.

See also
 Gender inequality in Ukraine
 Human trafficking in Ukraine
 Prostitution in Ukraine

Notes

References
 
 
 

Prostitution in Ukraine
Child prostitution